Great Smoky Mountains National Park is an American national park in the southeastern United States, with parts in North Carolina and Tennessee. The park straddles the ridgeline of the Great Smoky Mountains, part of the Blue Ridge Mountains, which are a division of the larger Appalachian Mountain chain. The park contains some of the highest mountains in eastern North America, including Clingmans Dome, Mount Guyot, and Mount Le Conte. The border between the two states runs northeast to southwest through the center of the park. The Appalachian Trail passes through the center of the park on its route from Georgia to Maine. With 14.1 million visitors in 2021, the Great Smoky Mountains National Park is the most visited national park in the United States.

The park encompasses , making it one of the largest protected areas in the eastern United States. The main park entrances are located along U.S. Highway 441 (Newfound Gap Road) in the towns of Gatlinburg, Tennessee and Cherokee, North Carolina, and also in Townsend, Tennessee. The park is internationally recognized for its mountains, waterfalls, biodiversity, and forests. In addition, the park also preserves multiple historical structures that were part of communities occupied by early European-American settlers of the area.

The park was chartered by the United States Congress in 1934, and officially dedicated by President Franklin D. Roosevelt in 1940. The Great Smoky Mountains was the first national park having land and other costs paid in part with federal funds; previous parks were funded wholly with state money or private funds. The park was designated as a UNESCO World Heritage Site in 1983, and an International Biosphere Reserve in 1988.

As the most visited national park in the United States, the Great Smoky Mountains National Park anchors a large tourism industry based in Sevier County, Tennessee adjacent to the park. Major attractions include Dollywood, the second-most visited tourist attraction in Tennessee, Ober Gatlinburg, and Ripley's Aquarium of the Smokies. Tourism to the park contributes an estimated $2.5 billion annually into the local economy.

History
For thousands of years, this region was occupied by successive cultures of indigenous peoples. The historic Cherokee had their homeland here, and occupied numerous towns in the river valleys on both sides of the Appalachian Mountains. Their first encounters with Europeans were as traders, mostly coming from the colonial Carolinas and Virginia.

European Americans did not begin to settle here until the late 18th and early 19th centuries.  Particularly because of their pressure to acquire land in the Deep South, in 1830 President Andrew Jackson signed the Indian Removal Act, beginning the process that eventually resulted in the forced removal of all Indian tribes east of the Mississippi River to Indian Territory (now Oklahoma).

Most of the Cherokee were also removed. For a period some, led by such warriors as Tsali, evaded removal by staying in the area now part of the Great Smoky Mountains National Park. A band on the Oconaluftee River acquired land and also remained. Their descendants make up most of the federally recognized Eastern Band of Cherokee Indians, based in Cherokee, North Carolina, and their Qualla Boundary reserve to the south of the park.

John Mingus, who built the Mingus Mill, and Ralph Hughes settled on the Oconaluftee in 1795. Other settlers soon followed and began clearing land and farming. In 1818, John Oliver and his family were the first white settlers to move into Cades Cove. After 1821, more families settled in Cades Cove including the Jobes, Gregorys, Sparkes, and Cables. As the community began to grow, the Cades Cove Baptist Church was established in 1827.

As white settlers arrived, entrepreneurs developed logging as a major industry in the mountains. The Little River Railroad was constructed by Colonel W. B. Townsend in the late-19th century to haul timber out of the remote regions of the area. Colonel Townsend had purchased 86,000 acres of land on the Little River. The construction of the Little River Railroad set an example for larger companies like the Ritter Lumber Company, Montvale Timber Company, and Norwood Lumber to also purchase acres of land for logging. The logging company Champion purchased  of land which included the Greenbrier Cove area and areas from Clingman's Dome to Mount Kephart. By 1909 logging was at its peak and by 1920 about two-thirds of the Great Smoky Mountains National Park area had been logged or burned by fires from logging operations.  

Because cut-and-run-style clearcutting was destroying the natural beauty of the area, by the 20th century visitors and locals banded together to raise money for preservation of the land. The U.S. National Park Service wanted a park in the eastern United States, but did not have much money to establish one. David C. Chapman; a Knoxville, Tennessee, business leader; was appointed in 1925 to head a commission to establish a national park here. Congress authorized the park in 1926, but there was no nucleus of federally owned land around which to develop it. John D. Rockefeller Jr. contributed $5 million, the U.S. government added $2 million, and private citizens from Tennessee and North Carolina pitched in to assemble the land for the park, piece by piece.

Slowly, mountain homesteaders, miners, and loggers were evicted from the land. Farms and timbering operations were abolished to establish the protected areas of the park. Travel writer Horace Kephart, for whom Mount Kephart was named, and photographers Jim Thompson and George Masa were instrumental in fostering the development of the park. Ben W. Hooper, a former governor of Tennessee,  was the principal land purchasing agent for the park, which was officially established on June 15, 1934.  During the Great Depression, the Civilian Conservation Corps, the Works Progress Administration, and other federal organizations hired workers to build trails, fire watchtowers, and other infrastructure improvements to the park and Smoky Mountains.

Geology
The majority of rocks in the Great Smoky Mountains National Park are Late Precambrian rocks that are part of the Ocoee Supergroup. This group consists of metamorphosed sandstones, phyllites, schists, and slate. Early Precambrian rocks are not only the oldest rocks in the park but also the dominant rock type in sites such as the Raven Fork Valley and upper Tuckasegee River between Cherokee and Bryson City. They primarily consist of metamorphic gneiss, granite, and schist. Cambrian sedimentary rocks can be found among the bottom of the Foothills to the northwest, and in limestone coves such as Cades Cove. One of the most visited attractions in the mountains is Cades Cove, which is a window or an area where older rocks made out of sandstone surround the valley floor of younger rocks made out of limestone.

The oldest rocks in the Smokies are the Precambrian gneiss and schists which were formed over a billion years ago from the accumulation of marine sediments and igneous rock. In the Late Precambrian, the primordial ocean expanded and the more recent Ocoee Supergroup rocks formed from the accumulation of eroding land mass onto the continental shelf. In the Paleozoic Era, the ocean deposited a thick layer of marine sediments which left behind sedimentary rock. During the Ordovician Period, the collision of the North American and African tectonic plates initiated the Alleghenian orogeny that created the Appalachian range. During the Mesozoic Era rapid erosion of softer sedimentary rocks re-exposed the older Ocoee Supergroup formations.

Environment

The wide range of elevations mimics the latitudinal changes found throughout the entire eastern United States. Ascending the mountains is comparable to a trip from Tennessee to Canada. Plants and animals common in the country's Northeast have found suitable ecological niches in the park's higher elevations, while southern species find homes in the balmier lower reaches.

Climate
According to the Köppen climate classification system, Great Smoky Mountains National Park has two climate types: humid subtropical (Cfa), and temperate oceanic (Cfb). The plant hardiness zone at Clingmans Dome Visitor Center is 5b with an average annual extreme minimum temperature of -14.3 °F (-25.7 °C).

The humid, subtropical air mass typically in place over the Smoky Mountains produces large amounts of precipitation. Flash flooding often occurs after heavy rain.

Mountain waves are strongest in a narrow area along the foothills, and can create extensive areas of fallen trees and roof damage, especially around Cades Cove and Cove Mountain. Strong winds created by mountain waves were a contributing factor in the devastating Gatlinburg fire on November 28, 2016, during the 2016 Great Smoky Mountains wildfires. Damaging winds can also be generated by strong thunderstorms, with tornadoes and strong thunderstorm complexes (also known as mesoscale convective systems) occasionally affecting the Smoky Mountains.

Air pollution
The park is affected by air pollution because of increased development. In a 2004 report by the National Parks Conservation Association, Great Smoky Mountains National Park was considered the most polluted national park. From 1999 to 2003, the park recorded approximately 150 unhealthy air days, the equivalent of about one month of unhealthy air days per year. In 2013, Colorado State University reported that, due to the passing of the United States Clean Air Act in 1970, and the subsequent implementation of the Acid Rain Program, there had been a "significant improvement" to the air quality in the Great Smoky Mountains from 1990 to 2010.

Biology and ecology
The park is almost 95 percent forested, and almost 36 percent of it, is estimated by the Park Service to be old growth forest with many trees that predate European settlement of the area. It is one of the largest blocks of deciduous, temperate, old growth forest in North America.

The variety of elevations, the abundant rainfall, and the presence of old growth forests give the park an unusual richness of biota. About 19,000 species of organisms are known to live in the park, and estimates as high as an additional 100,000 undocumented species may also be present.

Park officials count more than 200 species of birds, 50 species of fish, 39 species of reptiles, and 43 species of amphibians, including many lungless salamanders. The park is an important site for salamanders. The park has a noteworthy black bear population, numbering about 1,500. An attempt to reintroduce red wolves into the park in 1991 failed drastically, forcing the U.S. Fish and Wildlife Services to remove the wolves from the area in 1998. Elk (wapiti) were reintroduced to the park in 2001, three years after the FWS removed the red wolves from the area. Elk are most abundant in the Cataloochee area in the southeastern section of the park.

It is also home to species of mammals such as the raccoon, bobcat, two species of fox, river otter, woodchuck, beaver, two species of squirrel, opossum, coyote, white-tailed deer, chipmunk, two species of skunk, and various species of bats.

Over 100 species of trees grow in the park. The lower region forests are dominated by deciduous leafy trees. At higher altitudes, deciduous forests give way to coniferous trees like Fraser fir. In addition, the park has over 1,400 flowering plant species and over 4,000 species of non-flowering plants.

Fish 
There have been hundreds of known species of fish living in the area.

List of fish 
Source:

 American gizzard shad
 Lamoetra appendix
 Longnose gar
 Mountain brook lamprey
 Brook trout

Attractions and activities

The Great Smoky Mountains National Park is a major tourist attraction in the region. It has been the most visited national park for many years, with over 14.1 million recreational visitors (tourists) in 2021. The recreational figure represents nearly twice as many tourists as the Grand Canyon, which received nearly 6 million visitors the same year. Surrounding towns, notably Gatlinburg, Pigeon Forge, Sevierville, and Townsend, Tennessee, and Cherokee, Sylva, Maggie Valley, and Bryson City, North Carolina, receive a significant portion of their income from tourism associated with the park.

The two main visitor centers inside the park are Sugarlands Visitors' Center near the Gatlinburg entrance to the park and Oconaluftee Visitor Center near Cherokee, North Carolina, at the eastern entrance to the park.  These ranger stations provide exhibits on wildlife, geology, and the history of the park.  They also sell books, maps, and souvenirs. Entrance into the park is free.

U.S. Highway 441 (known in the park as Newfound Gap Road) bisects the park, providing automobile access to many trailheads and overlooks, most notably that of Newfound Gap. It was here that in 1940, from the Rockefeller Memorial, Franklin Delano Roosevelt dedicated the national park. On clear days Newfound Gap offers arguably the most spectacular scenes accessible via highway in the park.

The park has a number of historical attractions. The most well-preserved of these (and most popular) is Cades Cove, a valley with a number of preserved historic buildings including log cabins, barns, and churches. Cades Cove is the single most frequented destination in the national park. Self-guided automobile and bicycle tours offer the many sightseers a glimpse into the way of life of old-time southern Appalachia.  Other historical areas within the park include Roaring Fork, Cataloochee, Elkmont, and the Mountain Farm Museum and Mingus Mill on the Oconaluftee River.

Hiking

Mount Le Conte is one of the most frequented destinations in the park. Alum Cave Trail is the most heavily used of the five paths en route to the summit. It provides many scenic overlooks and unique natural attractions such as Alum Cave Bluffs and Arch Rock. Hikers may spend a night at the LeConte Lodge, located near the summit, which provides cabins and rooms for rent (except during the winter season). Accessible solely by trail, it is the only private lodging available inside the park.

Another popular hiking trail led to the pinnacle of the Chimney Tops, so named because of its unique dual-humped peaktops. This short but strenuous trek rewarded nature enthusiasts with a spectacular panorama of the surrounding mountain peaks. It was the flashpoint for the 2016 Great Smoky Mountains wildfires, and therefore sustained extensive damage, evident still today in clearly visible burn scars. The peak has been closed to tourists ever since.

Both the Laurel Falls and Clingmans Dome trails offer relatively easy, short, paved paths to their respective destinations.

In addition to day hiking, the national park offers opportunities for backpacking and camping. Camping is allowed only in designated camping areas and shelters. Most of the park's trail shelters are located along the Appalachian Trail or a short distance away on side trails. In addition to the Appalachian Trail shelters used mostly for extended backpacking trips there are three shelters in the park that are not located on the Appalachian Trail. The Mt. LeConte Shelter is located a short distance east of LeConte Lodge on The Boulevard Trail. It can accommodate 12 people per night, and is the only backcountry site in the entire park that has a permanent ban on campfires. The Kephart Shelter is located at the terminus of the Kephart Prong Trail which begins upstream of the Collins Creek Picnic Area. The shelter, situated along a tributary of the Oconaluftee River can accommodate 14 people. Laurel Gap Shelter is one of the more remote shelters in the park. Situated in a Beech forest swag between Balsam High Top and Big Cataloochee Mountain, the Laurel Gap Shelter can accommodate up to 14 people per night. This shelter is a popular base camp for peakbaggers exploring the heart of the Smokies wilderness.

Designated backcountry campsites are scattered throughout the park. A permit, available at ranger stations and via the park website, is required for all backcountry camping. Additionally, reservations are required for all of the shelters and backcountry campsites. A maximum stay of one night, in the case of shelters, or three nights, in the case of campsites, may limit the traveler's itinerary.

Other activities
After hiking and simple sightseeing, fishing (especially fly fishing) is the most popular activity in the national park.  The park's waters have long had a reputation for healthy trout activity as well as challenging fishing terrain. Brook trout are native to the waters, while both brown and rainbow were introduced to the area. Partially due to the fact of recent droughts killing off the native fish, there are strict regulations regarding how fishing may be conducted.  Horseback riding (offered by the national park and on limited trails), bicycling (available for rent in Cades Cove) and water tubing are all also practiced within the park.

From late May to early June, the Elkmont area of the park hosts the peak display period for synchronous fireflies (Photinus carolinus), one of at least 19 species of fireflies that live in Great Smoky Mountains National Park. They are the only species in America whose individuals can synchronize their flashing light patterns.

Historic areas within the national park

The park service maintains four historic districts and one archaeological district within park boundaries, as well as nine individual listings on the National Register of Historic Places.  Notable structures not listed include the Mountain Farm Museum buildings at Oconaluftee and buildings in the Cataloochee area.  The Mingus Mill (in Oconaluftee) and Smoky Mountain Hiking Club cabin in Greenbrier have been deemed eligible for listing.

Historic districts
 Cades Cove Historic District
 Elkmont Historic District
 Oconaluftee Archaeological District
 Noah Ogle Place
 Roaring Fork Historic District

Individual listings

 Alex Cole Cabin
 Clingmans Dome Observation Tower
 Hall Cabin (in Hazel Creek area)
 John Messer Barn
 John Ownby Cabin
 Oconaluftee Baptist Church (also called Smokemont Baptist Church)
 Tyson McCarter Place
 Mayna Treanor Avent Studio
 Little Greenbrier School
 Walker Sisters Place

Cultural importance
The park was used for filming scenes of Disney's hit 1950s TV series Davy Crockett, King of the Wild Frontier.

This park was designated an International Biosphere Reserve in 1976, was certified as a UNESCO World Heritage Site in 1983, and became a part of the Southern Appalachian Biosphere Reserve in 1988.

A 75th anniversary re-dedication ceremony was held on 2 September 2009.  Among those in attendance were the four U.S. senators from Tennessee and North Carolina, the three US Representatives whose districts include the park, the governors of both states, and Secretary of the Interior Ken Salazar. Dolly Parton, Tennessee native, singer, and actress also attended and performed.

The wildfires killed at least 14, injured 190, and forced the evacuation of more than 14,000 people. The fires also damaged or destroyed at least 2,000 structures. The fires, which were initially suspected to have been caused by arson, occurred during a period of unusual drought, which accelerated the fires. The wildfires were the deadliest in the Eastern United States since the Great Fires of 1947, and comprised one of the worst natural disasters in the history of Tennessee.

In 2015 Cassius Cash was appointed as the first African-American superintendent of Great Smoky Mountains National Park. He is the 16th superintendent of the park.

In 2023, the national park will be featured on a USPS Priority Mail Express stamp depicting a scene near the Newfound Gap. The stamp was designed by USPS art director Greg Breeding, with art from Dan Cosgrove.

See also
 Great Smoky Mountains Association
 Great Smoky Mountains Heritage Center
 Wildflowers of the Great Smoky Mountains
 List of birds of Great Smoky Mountains National Park
 List of national parks of the United States

References

Bibliography

External links

 of the National Park Service (NPS)
Atlas of the Smokies  – NPS species location mapper
Satellite image at NASA Earth Observatory
General administrative files of Great Smoky Mountains National Park
Great Smoky Mountains Association – nonprofit partner of the park
Spring wildflower hikes at wildflowerpilgrimage.org
The Influence of Terrain during the 27 April 2011 Super Tornado Outbreak and 5 July 2012 Derecho around the Great Smoky Mountains National Park
Historic American Engineering Record (HAER) documentation, filed under Gatlinburg, Sevier County, TN:

 
Great Smoky Mountains
Biosphere reserves of the United States
Blue Ridge National Heritage Area
Civilian Conservation Corps in North Carolina
Civilian Conservation Corps in Tennessee
Historic American Engineering Record in Tennessee
National parks in North Carolina
National parks in Tennessee
National parks of the Appalachians
North Carolina outdoor recreation
Old-growth forests
Protected areas established in 1934
Protected areas of Blount County, Tennessee
Protected areas of Cocke County, Tennessee
Protected areas of Haywood County, North Carolina
Protected areas of Sevier County, Tennessee
Protected areas of Swain County, North Carolina
Park, Great Smoky
Works Progress Administration in North Carolina
Works Progress Administration in Tennessee
World Heritage Sites in the United States
Gatlinburg, Tennessee
Geological type localities
1934 establishments in North Carolina
1934 establishments in Tennessee
East Tennessee
Western North Carolina
Places with bioluminescence